Phil, Phillip or Philip Lee may refer to:

Music
Philip John Lee (1944–2010), English flamenco guitarist
Phil Lee (born 1943), English jazz guitarist

Military and politics
Philip Corbin Lee (1681–1744), Colonial American naval officer, justice, sheriff, member of Maryland Upper House and King's Council

Philip Ludwell Lee (1727-1775), Colonial American naval officer, lawyer, planter, burgess and member of Virginia Governor's Council, nephew of Philip Corbin Lee
Philip R. Lee (1924-2020), American physician; Assistant Health Secretary
Philip S. Lee (born 1944), Canadian politician; Lieutenant Governor of Manitoba
Phillip Lee (politician) (born 1970), former UK Liberal Democrat member of Parliament, formerly elected as a Conservative

Religion
Philip Lee, English Archdeacon of Salop in 1398
Phillip Lee Jr., American minister and admiral; entered military service in 1982

Sport
Philip Lee (cricketer) (1904–1980), Australian cricketer
Philip Lee Fai Lap (born 1950), Hong Kong football manager during 2013–14 Hong Kong Rangers FC season
Phillip Lee (rugby league) (born 1977), Australian forward and hooker

See also
Philip Lee Williams (born 1950), American novelist, poet, and essayist
Lee Phillip (born 1981), Korean American actor
Lee Phillips (disambiguation)